Manzuma is a genus of African jumping spiders erected by Galina Azarkina in 2020 as part of a study of genera placed in the subtribe Aelurillina. During the study, she found that several species formerly placed in Rafalus, Aelurillus and Langelurillus were similar and distinct enough from the type species of these genera. Accordingly, she erected a new genus, transferring four species in addition to describing three new ones.

Species
 it contains seven species:
M. botswana Azarkina, 2020 – Botswana, South Africa
M. jocquei (Azarkina, Wesołowska & Russell-Smith, 2011) – Ivory Coast, Nigeria, Central African Rep.
M. kenyaensis (Dawidowicz & Wesołowska, 2016) – Kenya
M. lymphus (Próchniewicz & Hęciak, 1994) – Kenya
M. nigritibiis (Caporiacco, 1941) (type) – Ethiopia, Yemen
M. petroae Azarkina, 2020 – South Africa
M. tanzanica Azarkina, 2020 – Tanzania

See also
 Aelurillus
 Rafalus
 Saitis
 List of Salticidae genera

References

Further reading

 

Salticidae genera